Nola streptographia is a moth of the family Nolidae first described by George Hampson in 1900. It is found in Sri Lanka.

References

Moths of Asia
Moths described in 1900
streptographia